Daniel Barber may refer to:

 Daniel Barber (minister) (1756–1834), American Episcopalian minister
 Daniel Barber (director) (born 1965), British commercials and film director
 Danny Barber (soccer) (born 1971), retired U.S soccer midfielder
 Danny Barber (serial killer) (1955–1999), American serial killer
 Dan Barber (born 1969), American chef